Lumnitzera is an Indo-West Pacific mangrove genus in the family Combretaceae. An English common name is black mangrove. (However, "black mangrove" may also refer to the unrelated genus Avicennia.) Lumnitzera, named after the German botanist, Stephan Lumnitzer (1750-1806), occurs in mangroves from East Africa to the Western Pacific (including Fiji and Tonga), and northern Australia. 

The genus has two species of similar vegetative appearance but with differing flower colour. Lumnitzera littorea has red flowers whereas Lumnitzera racemosa has white flowers. Both species have flat and spoon-shaped (spathulate) leaves with emarginate tips. L. racemosa dominates in the western part of the range and L. littorea dominates in the east. Hybrids occur within the zone of overlap (Lumnitzera × rosea).

Three genera of the tropical woody family Combretaceae, Laguncularia, Conocarpus, and Lumnitzera, are found in mangroves but Lumnitzera is the only one to occur in the Indo-West Pacific mangroves, including Australia.

Lumnitzera racemosa var. racemosa (Tonga mangrove) is a protected tree in South Africa.

List of species
Lumnitzera littorea 
Lumnitzera pedicellata 
Lumnitzera racemosa 
Lumnitzera × rosea 

There have been a number of taxa that possessed the Lumnitzera genus that are now unplaced or assigned to other taxa:
 Lumnitzera caesia Spreng., unplaced
 Lumnitzera capitata (Roth) Spreng., synonym of Platostoma hispidum (L.) A.J.Paton
 Lumnitzera carnosa Spreng., synonym of Ocimum carnosum (Spreng.) Link & Otto ex Benth.
 Lumnitzera coccinea Wight & Arn., synonym of Lumnitzera littorea (Jack) Voigt
 Lumnitzera densiflora (Roth) Spreng., synonym of Isodon rugosus (Wall. ex Benth.) Codd
 Lumnitzera fastigiata (Roth) Spreng., synonym of Salvia plebeia R.Br.
 Lumnitzera lutea C.Presl, synonym of Lumnitzera racemosa var. lutea (Gaudich.) Exell
 Lumnitzera montana F.Muell., synonym of Macropteranthes montana (F.Muell.) F.Muell. ex Benth.
 Lumnitzera moschata (R.Br.) Spreng., synonym of Basilicum polystachyon (L.) Moench
 Lumnitzera pentandra Griff., synonym of Lumnitzera littorea (Jack) Voigt
 Lumnitzera polystachyon (L.) J.Jacq. ex Spreng., synonym of Basilicum polystachyon (L.) Moench
 Lumnitzera prostrata (L.) Spreng., synonym of Platostoma menthoides (L.) A.J.Paton
 Lumnitzera purpurea (Gaudich.) C. Presl, synonym of Lumnitzera littorea (Jack) Voigt
 Lumnitzera rubicunda (D.Don) Spreng., synonym of Orthosiphon rubicundus (D.Don) Benth.
 Lumnitzera salvioides (B.Heyne ex Roth) Spreng., synonym of Plectranthus salvioides (B.Heyne ex Roth) Benth.
 Lumnitzera tenuiflora (L.) Spreng., synonym of Ocimum tenuiflorum L.
 Lumnitzera virgata (D.Don) Spreng., synonym of Orthosiphon rubicundus var. rubicundus''

References

External links

Combretaceae
Mangroves
Protected trees of South Africa
Myrtales genera